Octavien is both a given name and surname. Notable people with the name include:

Octavien de Saint-Gelais (1468–1502), French churchman, poet, and translator
Steve Octavien (born 1984), American football player

See also
Octavian (disambiguation)